AA3 or AA-3 may refer to:

 Phoenix Wright: Ace Attorney − Trials and Tribulations, the third video game of the series
 America's Army 3, one of several version of the video game
 ATRAC files use the file extension .aa3
 AA-3 Anab, Kaliningrad K-8 (R-8)'s, a medium-range air-to-air missile, NATO reporting name
 AA3, Gardiner's designated symbol for the hieroglyph that represents a pustule with liquid issuing from it
 Aa3, a credit rating given by Moody's Investors Service